The Seymour Cray Computer Engineering Award, also known as the Seymour Cray Award, is an award given by the IEEE Computer Society, to recognize significant and innovative contributions in the field of high-performance computing. The award honors scientists who exhibit the creativity demonstrated by Seymour Cray, founder of Cray Research, Inc., and an early pioneer of supercomputing. Cray was an American electrical engineer and supercomputer architect who designed a series of computers that were the fastest in the world for decades, and founded Cray Research which built many of these machines. Called "the father of supercomputing," Cray has been credited with creating the supercomputer industry. He played a key role in the invention and design of the UNIVAC 1103, a landmark high-speed computer and the first computer available for commercial use.

In 1972 the IEEE presented Cray with the Harry H. Goode Memorial Award for his contributions to large-scale computer design and the development of multiprocessing systems. One year after Cray's death in 1996, IEEE created the Seymour Cray Computer Engineering Award in honor of his creative spirit. The award is one of the 12 technical awards sponsored by the IEEE computer society as recognition given to pioneers in the field of computer science and engineering. The winner receives a crystal memento, certificate, and US$10,000 honorarium.

The first recipient, in 1999, was John Cocke.

Nomination and Ceremony

The following criteria are considered when selecting a recipient: 

 Leadership in field
 Breadth of work
 Achievement in other fields
 Inventive value (patents)
 Individual vs. group contribution
 Publications (articles, etc.)
 Originality of contribution
 Quality of nomination
 IEEE Society activities and honors
 Quality of endorsements

The annual nomination deadline is July 1. Anyone may nominate a candidate, although self-nomination is not allowed. A candidate must receive at least three nominations to be considered by the award committee. Nominations should be prepared and submitted through the IEEE official website.

The Seymour Cray Computer Engineering Award presentation and reception are held at the SC conference, the international conference for high-performance computing networks, storage, and analysis. The conference is sponsored by the ACM (Association for Computing Machinery) and the IEEE Computer Society. It is held annually in mid-November. Several other IEEE sponsored awards are presented at the same event, including the ACM Gordon Bell Prize, the ACM/IEEE-CS Ken Kennedy Award, the ACM/IEEE-CS George Michael Memorial HPC Fellowship, the ACM SIGHPC / Intel Computational & Data Science Fellowships, the IEEE-CS Seymour Cray Computer Engineering Award, and the IEEE-CS Sidney Fernbach Memorial Award.

Recipients

See also

List of computer-related awards
List of computer science awards
List of prizes named after people
IEEE John von Neumann Medal
Gordon Bell Prize

References

External links
 

Cray
Computer science awards
Supercomputers
IEEE society and council awards